The 1995 World Figure Skating Championships were held in Birmingham, UK on 7–12 March. Medals were awarded in the disciplines of men's singles, ladies' singles, pair skating, and ice dancing.

Medal tables

Medalists

Medals by country

Results

Men

Ladies

Note: Jenna Arrowsmith placed 29th in the short program but competed in the free skate due to a special ISU rule, which allowedfor a skater from the host country to advance to the free skate, if no skater from that country qualified automatically.

Pairs

Ice dancing

References

External links
 results
 L.A. Times Kovarikova-Novotny Men's SP report
  
  
  
  

World Figure Skating Championships
1995 in English sport
1990s in Birmingham, West Midlands
International figure skating competitions hosted by the United Kingdom
International sports competitions in Birmingham, West Midlands
March 1995 sports events in the United Kingdom